Cumali (and its variant Cumalı) is a masculine given name and a surname. People with the name include:

Given name
 Cumali Bişi (born 1993), Turkish footballer

Surname
 Necati Cumalı (1921–2001), Turkish writer

Turkish masculine given names
Turkish-language surnames